is a paralympic athlete from Japan competing mainly in category T11 sprint events.

Koji competed in the 100m and 4 × 100 m in the 2000 Summer Paralympics winning a silver medal with his teammates in the 4 × 100 m. He also competed in the 100m and 200m in 2004 but was unable to medal in either event.

References

Paralympic athletes of Japan
Athletes (track and field) at the 2000 Summer Paralympics
Athletes (track and field) at the 2004 Summer Paralympics
Paralympic silver medalists for Japan
Japanese male sprinters
Living people
Medalists at the 2000 Summer Paralympics
Year of birth missing (living people)
Paralympic medalists in athletics (track and field)
Visually impaired sprinters
Paralympic sprinters
21st-century Japanese people